James R. Lyon (November 4, 1833c. 1914) was an American merchant, Republican politician, and Union Army volunteer in the American Civil War.

Biography
Lyon was born on November 4, 1833, in Benton, New York. He later resided in Glendale, Monroe County, Wisconsin, and Sparta, Wisconsin. During the American Civil War, he served in Company I of the 6th Wisconsin Volunteer Infantry Regiment in the Union Army. Lyon was a merchant by trade.

Assembly career
Lyon was elected to the Assembly in 1888 and was defeated seeking re-election in 1890. He was a Republican.

Electoral history

| colspan="6" style="text-align:center;background-color: #e9e9e9;"| General Election, November 6, 1888

| colspan="6" style="text-align:center;background-color: #e9e9e9;"| General Election, November 4, 1890

References

People from Benton, New York
People from Sparta, Wisconsin
Republican Party members of the Wisconsin State Assembly
19th-century American politicians
People of Wisconsin in the American Civil War
Union Army soldiers
19th-century American merchants
1833 births
Year of death missing